Indian Idol Marathi is the Indian Marathi language version of the Pop Idol format and is part of Indian Idol. It has aired on Sony Marathi since 22 November 2021. Ajay–Atul are the judges of the show and Swanandi Tikekar and Prajakta Mali is hosting the show.

Summary

Season 1 
 Judges   
Ajay–Atul

 Host
Swanandi Tikekar

Prajakta Mali

Top 15 Contestants

Guests

References

External links 
 Indian Idol Marathi at Sony LIV

Marathi
Sony Marathi original programming
Television series by Fremantle (company)
2021 Indian television series debuts
Indian television series based on British television series
Marathi-language television shows
2022 Indian television series endings